Joseph Gébara (born June 10, 1965 in Amatour, Lebanon) is a Lebanese Catholic archeparch of the Byzantine Rite, and current Archeparch of the Melkite Greek Catholic Archeparchy of Petra and Philadelphia in Amman.

Biography

After his institutional studies, Joseph Gébara obtained a degree in philosophy at the Theological Institute of São Paulo, in Harissa (1995) and a master's degree in theology at the Catholic Institute of Paris (1998) and an Advanced Studies Diploma (DEA) in patristic (2000) and a PhD in history of religions and religious anthropology (2003) from the University of Sorbonne in Paris.

He was ordained a priest for the Melkite Greek Catholic Archeparchy of Beirut and Byblos on 10 July 1993. Gébara performed the pastoral ministry in the Church of Saint Elias in Dekwaneh (1993-1995); during his post-graduate studies in Paris he worked in parishes Saint-Julien-le-Pauvre (1996-1998) and Notre-Dame des Champs in Montparnasse (1998-2003). He returned to Lebanon in 2003, and was appointed parish priest of Notre-Dame Church Hadath Liberation. Gébara was Dean of the third district of Beirut (2006-2011).

Gébara was named coadjutor bishop of the Melkite Greek Catholic Eparchy of Nossa Senhora do Paraíso on October 31, 2013, being consecrated on December 21, by the Greek Melkite Patriarch of Antioch and All the East, Alexandria and Jerusalem Gregory III Laham. He succeeded eparch Farès Maakaroun after his renounce on 21 July 2014.

On February 20, 2018 Pope Francis accepted his election by the Melkite Synod as Archeparch of the Melkite Greek Catholic Archeparchy of Petra and Philadelphia in Amman.

He speaks Arabic and French and knows the classical languages.

References

External links
 https://web.archive.org/web/20141222023829/http://www.cnbb.org.br/imprensa-1/noticias/14607-dom-joseph-gebara-assume-eparquia-de-nossa-senhora-do-paraiso
 http://www.catholic-hierarchy.org/bishop/bgebara.html

1965 births
Lebanese emigrants to Brazil
Melkite Greek Catholic bishops
Eastern Catholic bishops in Brazil
Living people
Brazilian Melkite Greek Catholics